Demetric Austin (born January,1,1995) is an American professional basketball player. Standing at 2.01 m (6'7"), he plays the power forward position. After two years at Dillard University, Austin entered the 2017 NBA draft but was not selected in the draft's two rounds.

High school career
Austin played high school basketball at Springbrook High School, in Silver Spring, Maryland.

College career
After graduating from Springbrook High School, Austin played college basketball for the Dillard University from 2015 to 2017.

Playing career
After going undrafted in the 2017 NBA draft Austin started his professional career with Barreirense of the Portuguese LPB. With Barreirense, he averaged 19.4 points and 7.9 rebounds per game.

After his first pro year, Austin joined Pertevniyal in Turkey.

On December 13, 2018, he left the club and joined Panionios of the Greek Basket League until the end of the season. On August 31, 2019, Austin renewed his contract with Panionios. Three days later, he was unexpectedly released due to having to attend to a serious personal matter in the United States.

On February 7, 2020, he joined Sporting CP, team of the Portuguese Basketball League. Twenty five days later, he left the club.

Personal life
When he was 10 years old, Austin became a victim of a gunshot wound. After the incident, Austin was afraid to go outside due to the gunshot. His fear came to an end after attending at the Springbrook High School.

References

External links
Profile at eurobasket.com
Profile at realgm.com
Profile at njcaa.org

1993 births
Living people
American expatriate basketball people in Greece
American expatriate basketball people in Portugal
American expatriate basketball people in Turkey
American men's basketball players
Barreirense Basket players
Basketball players from Washington, D.C.
Dillard Bleu Devils basketball players
Sporting CP basketball players
Panionios B.C. players
Pertevniyal S.K. players
Power forwards (basketball)